Bodea may refer to:

  998 Bodea, a main-belt asteroid
  Cosmin Bodea, Romanian football manager and former player